The National People's Party is a Gambian political party founded in December 2019 by incumbent President of the Gambia, Adama Barrow.

History 
The NPP was founded in December 2019 by Adama Barrow as a vehicle to seek a second term in the 2021 Gambian presidential election. Relations had deteriorated between Barrow and his former party, the United Democratic Party (UDP). In 2019, Barrow dismissed UDP party leader Ousainou Darboe as his Vice-President following disagreements. Dou Sano, a presidential adviser, told the press that the "National People’s Party is here for all Gambians, it is here to wipe the tears of Gambians by solving the problems of Gambians." Reaction to the creation of the party was varied. Some Gambians commented that as a citizen Barrow had every right to found a party, while others argued it was a betrayal of the Coalition 2016 agenda.

Governance 
Barrow is party leader and Secretary General of the party. It was registered with the Independent Electoral Commission on 31 December 2019.

Electoral history

Presidential elections

National Assembly elections

References 

Political parties established in 2019
Political parties in the Gambia